Fr. Edmund Aloysius Walsh, S.J. (October 10, 1885 – October 31, 1956) was an American Jesuit Catholic priest, author, professor of geopolitics and founder of the Georgetown University School of Foreign Service, the first school for international affairs in the United States. He founded the school in 1919–six years before the U.S. Foreign Service itself existed–and served as its first regent.

Background
Edmund Aloysius Walsh was born on October 10, 1885.  He had a brother.

Walsh studied at Boston College and Jesuit seminaries in Frederick, Maryland, and Poughkeepsie, New York.  He studied thereafter in London, Dublin, and Innsbruck.  He received an AB, PhD, and LittD from Georgetown University, as well as LLD from the University of Delaware and MA from Woodstock.

Career
In 1902, Walsh joined the Society of Jesus and was ordained in 1916.  During that time, he taught literature at Georgetown.  On May 5, 1918, he became dean of Georgetown's College of Arts & Sciences.  During World War I (WWI) he served special duties as assistant educational director to the "Students' Army Training Corps."

In 1922, while studying schools of political science, Walsh received appointment as Catholic representative to the American Relief Administration, AKA the "Hoover Mission."  He arrived in Russia in March 1922 to serve the mission.  In June 1922, however, Pope Pius XI as director general of a Papal Relief Mission, during which time he "conducted extensive negotiations with the Soviet leaders of that time on behalf of Catholic interests in Russia."  In 1922, while director general of the Papal Famine Relief Mission to Russia, Walsh succeeded in securing for the Vatican the Holy Relics of St. Andrew Bobola (they were actually transported to Rome by the Walsh's Assistant Director, Louis J. Gallagher, who later wrote books both about Walsh and about Bobola).

In WWI's aftermath, Georgetown University established a School of Foreign Service and tapped Walsh to lead it. The school, which was the first of its kind, was intended to advance international peace by training diplomats, businesspersons, bankers, and traders with an education focused on international relations. University president John B. Creeden employed Walsh as the school's first Regent.  Classes began in October 1919. and the first class graduated in 1921.  After founding the school, Walsh continued to lead the school for several decades.  It was named for him in 1958, shortly after his death.

Walsh worked on behalf of the Vatican to resolve the long-standing issues between Church and State in Mexico in 1929, and negotiated with the Iraqi government to establish an American High School in Baghdad in 1931, Baghdad College.

In October 1941, Walsh publicly rebuked US President Franklin Delano Roosevelt for stating that the Soviet Constitution guaranteed freedom of religion.

After the Allies' victory in World War II, Walsh served as Consultant to the U.S. Chief of Counsel at the Nuremberg Trials.  One of his duties was to interrogate the German geopolitician General Karl Haushofer to determine whether he should be tried for war crimes. Haushofer's theory of international politics were said to have helped justify the Holocaust.

Walsh was strongly anti-Communist, informed in part by his famine relief work in 1922.  He became widely known as an anti-Communist author and rhetorician, so much so that he was rumored, falsely, to have been the man who first convinced Senator Joseph McCarthy that Communists had infiltrated the U.S. government and entertainment industry, and that he should use the anti-Communist issue in order to gain political prominence. Walsh vigorously promoted anti-Communist thought throughout his career.

Death
Edmund A. Walsh died age 71 on October 31, 1956, at Georgetown University Hospital of a brain hemorrhage.

Legacy

In its obituary, the New York Times remember Walsh as founder of the School of Foreign Service.  The Times added:      Father Walsh was a long-time leader in the fight against world communism.  By the spoken and written word, and with every force at his command, he had uncompromisingly opposed it since the day in 1923 when he returned from Moscow after heading the Paper Relief Mission to the Soviet Union for more than a year.      President Dwight D. Eisenhower sent a letter to Georgetown University when Father Walsh died in 1956, which read in part:
  

After his death in 1956, a new academic building constructed to house the school was named the Edmund A. Walsh Memorial Building in his memory.  The School has also been home to prominent faculty members including the historians Carroll Quigley, and Jules Davids, the political scientist, and World War II hero Jan Karski, and the first woman Secretary of State Madeleine Albright. On May 29, 2012, both Karski (posthumously) and Albright received the Presidential Medal of Freedom from U.S. President Barack Obama.

Walsh's most enduring legacy is the school he founded, which has become an incubator of leadership in the United States and internationally. Graduates of the School have included U.S. President Bill Clinton, U.S. President Barack Obama's Chief of Staff Denis McDonough, U.S. President Donald Trump's Chief of Staff Mick Mulvaney and the leaders of the U.S. intelligence community (George Tenet), the American labor movement (AFL-CIO President Lane Kirkland), and the American Catholic Church (New York Cardinal Archbishop John Joseph O'Connor). Heads of state educated at the School have included King Abdullah of Jordan, King Felipe VI of Spain, and Gloria Macapagal Arroyo of the Philippines.

Works
Walsh work's include The Fall of the Russian Empire: The story of the last of the Romanovs  and the coming of the Bolsheviki. (1928).
Books
 History and nature of international relations (1922)
 Fall of the Russian Empire (1928)
 Why Pope Pius XI Asked Prayers for Russia on March 19, 1930 (1930)
 Last Stand:  An Interpretation of the Soviet Five-Year Plan (1931)
 Ships and national safety; the role of a merchant marine in balanced economy (1934)
 Wood carver of Tyrol (1935)
Total Power: A Footnote to History (1949)
 Total empire; the roots and progress of world communism (1951)

See also
Michel d'Herbigny
Evalyn Walsh McLean

References
Notes

External sources
 Footnotes to history: selected speeches and writing of Edmund A. Walsh, S.J., founder of the School of Foreign Service  (1990), edited with commentary by Anna Watkins, introduced by Walter I. Giles
 McNamara, Patrick. A Catholic Cold War: Edmund A. Walsh, S.J., and the Politics of American Anticommunism New York: Fordham University Press, 2005

External links
GCache of the Digital Georgetown  describing the Walsh Building.
Georgetown University Location map pinpointing the Walsh Building.
Profile of Fr. Walsh from the Georgetown University newspaper.

Geopoliticians
1885 births
1956 deaths
19th-century American Jesuits
20th-century American Jesuits
American Roman Catholic priests
Georgetown University faculty
Deans of Georgetown College
Commanders Crosses of the Order of Merit of the Federal Republic of Germany
20th-century American academics